Pat Schmatz (born ca. 1960) is an American author of young adult fiction and middle grade fiction, best known for their James Tiptree Jr. Award winning novel Lizard Radio. Others of their well-known and award-winning works include Bluefish and The Key to Every Thing.

Personal life 
Schmatz grew up in rural Wisconsin. The Outsiders by S.E. Hinton was a life-changing book for them growing up. They read it in sixth grade and it ultimately made them decide that they wanted to start writing for children.

Selected works 
Their second novel and first young adult book, Mousetraps, tells the story of a teen dealing with homophobia and bullying after her childhood best friend who suddenly disappeared turns up again. It was published in 2008 by Carolrhoda and a nominee for the Lambda Literary Award in Children's/Young Adult in 2008.

Bluefish, their fourth novel, is about a boy moving to a new town where he lives with his alcoholic grandpa. He is befriended by a difficult and hilarious classmate who helps him see things in a new way. It was published by Candlewick in 2011 and received several starred reviews. Bluefish was a nominee for the Dorothy Canfield Fisher Children's Book Award in 2013 and the California Young Reader Medal for Middle School/Junior High in 2015. It won the Crystal Kite Award in 2012 and the Josette Frank Award in 2015.

Schmatz's fifth novel, Lizard Radio, is set in a world just slightly tilted from our own, where teens have to commit to a gender and "benders" are dealt with harshly. In the novel, a fifteen-year-old bender teen struggles in a culture that tries to define everyone by strict binaries. It was published by Candlewick in 2015.  Lizard Radio won the James Tiptree Jr. Award in 2015.

Bibliography 
Young adult fiction

 Mousestraps (Carolrhoda, 2008)
 Circle the Truth (Carolrhoda, 2010)
 Lizard Radio (Candlewick, 2015)

Middle grade fiction

 Mrs. Estronsky and the U.F.O. (Little Blue Works, 2001)
 Bluefish (Candlewick, 2011)
 The Key to Every Thing (Candlewick, 2018)

Awards 
Won

2012

 Crystal Kite Award for Bluefish (Candlewick, 2011)

2015

 James Tiptree Jr. Award for Lizard Radio (Candlewick, 2015)
 Josette Frank Award for Bluefish (Candlewick, 2011)

2019

 Minnesota Book Award for "The Key to Every Thing."

Nominations

2008

 Lambda Literary Award in Children's/Young Adult for Mousestraps (Carolrhoda, 2008)

2013

 Dorothy Canfield Fisher Children's Book Award for Bluefish (Candlewick, 2011)

2015

 California Young Reader Medal for Middle School/Junior High for Bluefish (Candlewick, 2011)

References 

Living people
21st-century American novelists
Michigan State University alumni
1960 births
People with non-binary gender identities
American transgender writers
American non-binary writers